Defined is an album by popera group Amici Forever released in 2005.

Track listing
"La Fiamma Sacra (The Sacred Flame)"
"Nella Fantasia"
"The Prayer"
"Aranjuez Ma Pensee"
"So Far Away"
"Nostalgia (La Mia Nostalgia)"
"Core'ngrato (Ungrateful Heart)"
"Land & Freedom (Terra e Liberta)"
"Mon cœur s'ouvre à ta voix"
"Recondita Armonia"
"Adagio"
"Ocean Heart (Oceano Cuore)"
"We are the Champions"

Australian Tour Edition
The 2006 Australian Tour Edition includes Frankie Goes To Hollywood's "The Power Of Love" as Track 13, with Queen's "We Are The Champions" moved to Track 14.

Charts

Weekly charts

Year-end charts

Certifications

References

2005 albums